Tevin is a given name.

Notable people with the name include

Tevin Arona (born 1995), Cook Islands rugby league footballer
Tevin Brown (born 1998), American basketball player
Tevin Campbell (born 1976), American singer-songwriter
Tevin Coleman (born 1993), American football player
Tevin Elliot (born 1991), American football player and criminal
Tevin Falzon (born 1992), American basketball player
Tevin Farmer (born 1990), American boxer 
Tevin Ferris (born 1996) New Zealand rugby union footballer
Tevin Gamboa (born 1994), Belizean footballer
Tevin Homer (born 1995), American football player
Tevin Ihrig (born 1995), German footballer
Tevin Imlach (born 1996), West Indian cricketer
Teven Jenkins (born 1998), American football player
Tevin Jones (born 1992), American football player
Tevin Kok (born 1996), South African field hockey player
Tevin Mack (born 1997), American basketball player
Tevin McDonald (born 1992), American football player
Tevin Mitchel (born 1992), American football player
Tevin Reese (born 1991), American football player
Tevin Shaw (born 1997), Jamaican footballer
Tevin Slater (born 1994), Saint Vincent and Grenadian footballer
Tevin Thomas, American musician
Tevin Vongvanich (born 1958), Thai businessman
Tevin Washington (born 1990), American football player
Tevin Westbrook (born 1993), American football player

See also
Tevaughn, given name